Starman (Theodore Henry "Ted" Knight) is a fictional superhero appearing in media published by DC Comics, primarily as a member of the Justice Society of America. Created by writer Gardner Fox and artist Jack Burnley, he first appeared in Adventure Comics #61 (April 1941).

Publication history

Invited by editor Whitney Ellsworth to create a new superhero character, Burnley drew the Starman costume as a variation of Superman's famous outfit, topped with a Buck Rogers-style helmet. Gardner Fox developed the character, and science-fiction writer Alfred Bester also contributed Starman scripts. Later in the run, Emil Gershwin wrote the stories, with art by Mort Meskin and George Roussos.

His first story in Adventure Comics #61 (April 1941) pitted Starman against the sinister Dr. Doog, who threatened the world with his invention, the Ultra-Dynamo.

He continued to appear in Adventure Comics through #102 (Feb 1946), and All-Star Comics #8 (Dec 1941) to #23 (Winter 1944).

Fictional character biography
As Starman, Ted wears a caped costume of red and green topped with a helmet with a fin on the top. He uses a gravity rod (later cosmic rod) which allows him to fly and to manipulate energy, at times in a manner similar to Green Lantern's power ring. As Ted Knight, he is an astronomer and an expert scientist, having developed the rods himself.

Initially intending it for use as a possible power source, Ted was convinced by his cousin, Sandra Knight, the Phantom Lady, to use his invention to become a costumed crime fighter. In the original 1940s stories, Starman operated out of Gotham City, but this was retconned in the 1990s to Opal City. 

Starman's first recurring villain is the Mist, an elderly scientist who develops an invisibility potion that leaves only his head and hands visible in mid-air. He first appears in Adventure Comics #67 (Nov 1941). Starman's rogues gallery also includes Astra the Astrologist, Cuthbert Cain, Dr. Doog and the Secret Brotherhood of the Electron, and the Veil.

He was a frequent ally of the FBI and a member of the Justice Society of America for much of the 1940s and, like other mystery men of the time, served in the wartime All-Star Squadron. In 1942 Ted enlists in the U.S. Army Air Force and serves very briefly as a pilot during World War II.

At this time, the love of Ted's life is a woman named Doris Lee, who often chastises her layabout playboy boyfriend for his pretended laziness and hypochondria, unaware of Ted's costumed persona. Doris is tragically murdered in the late 1940s and this event, combined with Ted's role in the creation of the atom bomb, causes him to suffer a nervous breakdown. He was confined to a mental institution for a number of years as a result.

In the 1990s-era Starman series, it is revealed that Ted is motivated to return to active duty in part by his own time-traveling son, Jack. Additionally, it is revealed in a 1990s retcon that Ted Knight has a brief affair with the first Black Canary (Dinah Drake) in the 1960s, both events filling in blank spots in the hero's past.

Like the rest of the Justice Society, Starman spends many years in retirement following the end of the Golden Age of heroes, but returns to help mentor the team's spiritual successors the Justice League of America. During his years as a civilian, Ted Knight marries a woman named Adele Doris Drew and has two children, Jack and David. David idolizes his father while Jack disdains the silliness of superhero life and his father's perceived focus on costumed adventure over family.

Starman is finally sidelined from hero work permanently by the events of the Zero Hour mini-series. Previously kept virile by the effects of an early JSA mission, Ted Knight is restored to his natural age by the temporal villain Extant. He subsequently hangs up the costume and concentrates on his original love — science.

Following Ted's retirement, David inherits his mantle as Starman, but is killed early in his career by the son of one of his father's old enemies. Jack then inherits the title, although not without grievances. The retired Ted Knight sometimes advises Jack and, over time, the two estranged Starmen reforged the bond of father and son. In exchange for Jack taking up the defense of Opal City, Ted agrees to use his cosmic-powered inventions for the benefit of mankind rather than simply costumed adventuring. Also, Ted was willing to lend aid and shelter to a simple, kind-hearted incarnation of Solomon Grundy and a former Starman, Mikaal Tomas. He also is targeted by the villainous Doctor Phosphorus, but he always staves off the irradiated monster.

In the final battle for the salvation of Opal City, Ted Knight confronted two of his deadliest enemies, further enhanced by the demon-lord Neron — Dr. Phosphorus and Ragdoll. Although tormented by seeing Ragdoll (whom he believed killed, either by Jay Garrick, Alan Scott, or his own hand) he was ultimately able to kill Phosphorus by raising him on a slab of concrete with his cosmic rod and then slamming him against the ground with the slab. Ragdoll leaves peacefully, but the battle leaves Knight terminally ill with cancer.

Ted eventually dies in battle with his old enemy, the Mist. With a variant of his gravity rod, he transported them both into the stratosphere where the Mist's doomsday bomb could detonate without harming the city, finishing him quickly and painlessly — with a hero's death by fire.

He appears still once more as a ghost, talking to Jack and giving him his blessing to leave Opal to live the life of a husband and father in San Francisco with his girlfriend, Sadie.

Powers and abilities
Ted Knight has no natural, superhuman powers. His abilities stem from the use of his inventions, the gravity rod and the cosmic rod. These devices channel an unknown form of stellar radiation, which Ted is able to manipulate through the rod. As Starman, he possesses the ability to fly, project bursts of stellar energy, light, and heat, create force fields and simple energy constructs, and levitate objects. Extended use of the cosmic rod created a bond between it and Ted, allowing him to mentally summon the rod when separated from it.

Ted possesses a brilliant intellect, mastery of several sciences, and a gift for invention. In addition to the gravity and cosmic rods, Ted created the cosmic staff used by his son, Jack, and the cosmic converter belt worn by his JSA teammates, the Star-Spangled Kid and Stargirl. He was at some point employed as a physics professor; one of his students, Justin Ballantine, grew up to become the powerful super villain Libra.

Ted Knight's contributions to science (especially physics and astrophysics) are not fully recognized in his lifetime. In his final years he meets the Legion of Super-Heroes' 30th century hero Star Boy, who tells Knight that his contributions were ultimately acknowledged hundreds of years after his death. His theories and writings were so revolutionary that, once fully understood, he is considered a peer of Isaac Newton and Galileo.

Other versions
 In JLA: Age of Wonder, Starman is portrayed as a fellow inventor alongside Superman, Thomas Edison, and Nikola Tesla, who invents his cosmic rod with technology gleaned from the rocket ship which brought Superman to Earth.
 In JSA: The Unholy Three, Starman is an intelligence agent working at the Chernobyl nuclear power plant, and is code-named Star.
 In JLA: Another Nail, Starman made a brief appearance when all time periods melded together.

Collected editions
 Golden Age Starman Archives Vol. 1 (Starman stories from Adventure Comics #61-76)
 Golden Age Starman Archives Vol. 2 (Starman stories from Adventure Comics #77-102)

In other media
 Ted Knight / Starman appears in the Batman: The Brave and the Bold episode "Crisis: 22,300 Miles Above Earth!", voiced by Jeff Bennett impersonating Ted Knight. This version is a member of an aged Justice Society of America.
 Ted Knight / Starman received a figure in Mattel's DC Universe Classics line.

References

External links
Starman (1941) at Don Markstein's Toonopedia. Archived from the original on October 23, 2017.
 JSA Fact File: Starman I
 Earth-2 Starman Index

Characters created by Gardner Fox
Comics characters introduced in 1941
DC Comics male superheroes
Earth-Two
Fictional astronomers
Fictional inventors
Golden Age superheroes
Starman (DC Comics)